Trafalgar Studios were a set of purpose-built artists' studios on in Manresa Road in the Chelsea area of London, England, just off the King's Road. A number or notable artists worked there.

The three-story, 15-unit block was built in 1878 by John Brass.

They were the first such studios in London, but further blocks were built nearby, attempting to emulate their success.

Studios 

Among the artists to work at the numbered studios were:

2 

 James Havard Thomas

4 

 c. 1933 – 1937 Clifford Hall

7 

 1886 – Henry Jamyn Brooks

8 
 c. 1937 – 1952 Clifford Hall

11 

 Edward Onslow Ford
 c. 1888 – 1892 John Wilson
 c. 1891 – 1892 George William Iliffe Wilson
 c. 1885 – 1901 Albert Arthur Toft (occupied studios with his brother Alfonso; also 12)

12 

 1900 – Albert Toft (see above)
 Circa 1927 – Arnrid Banniza Johnston
 1944 – Harry Thomas
 c. 1950 – 1951 Richard Alfred Thomas

13 

Herbert Granville Fell (also no 14)
 Edward Gordon Craig (also no 14)

14 

 1881–1898 – Rudolph Onslow Ford
 1911 – Aroldo du-Chêne de Vére
 Circa 1939 Frank Owen Dobson
 Frank Brangwyn
 Edward Gordon Craig (also no 13)

15 

 1881 – James Havard Thomas
 1927 Alfred Priest
c. 1933 – 1936 – Frank Owen Dobson

16 

 Circa 1890 – George Wilson

Unspecified 

 Mervyn Peake
Evelyn De Morgan, 1880s

References

External links 

 "278 Kings Road Chelsea, Manresa Road (painting, 1882) by Edward Lingwood, showing the building in the distance
 Photograph of a studio interior

Buildings and structures in the Royal Borough of Kensington and Chelsea
Artists' studios in London
Buildings and structures completed in 1878
19th-century architecture in the United Kingdom
Chelsea, London